Sonoma State University (SSU, Sonoma State, or Sonoma) is a public university in Rohnert Park in Sonoma County, California. It is one of the smallest members of the California State University (CSU) system. Sonoma State offers 92 bachelor's degree programs, 19 master's degree programs, and 11 teaching credentials. The university is a Hispanic-serving institution.

History

Founding
Sonoma State College was established by the California State Legislature in 1960 to be part of the California State College system, with significant involvement of the faculty from San Francisco State University. As with all California State Colleges, Sonoma State later became part of the California State University system. Sonoma opened for the first time in 1961, with an initial enrollment of 250 students. Classes offered took place in leased buildings in Rohnert Park where the college offered its first four-year Bachelor of Arts degree in Elementary Education.

Early development

As enrollment increased, Sonoma State built more on-campus facilities, including Ives Hall for performing arts, The University Commons for dining, a small library, and a gymnasium. These buildings followed the physical master plan of the school which stated that the facilities would be urban in character, defining the use of smooth concrete building façades with landscaped courtyards. Among the landscaping features added with these facilities were the "Campus Lakes", two small reservoirs located behind the Commons next to Commencement Lawn, the site of the university's annual commencement ceremonies, as well as one lake near a housing facility, Beaujolais Village; the lakes are home to local waterfowl.

In 1969, the first master's degrees in biology and psychology were offered. The new cluster school concept, coupled with a more intense focus on the surrounding rural environment, influenced the new physical master plan. The first facility built under the new plan was the Zinfandel residence area. The new Student Health Center used a primarily redwood façade with a landscaped ground cover of wild roses and poppies. Sonoma State was closed from May 7–11, 1970 after Governor Ronald Reagan ordered that all California colleges and universities shut down due to anti-war protests and rallies after the shootings of four students at Kent State University.

Early development of the modern campus came to a close in 1976 when the Student Union was constructed between the main quad and the lakes. This building continued the use of the physical master plan, using primarily redwood and preceded the similarly built Carson Hall, an art building, a childcare center, additional parking, and a computer center which was added onto the library.

The modern university
In 1978, Sonoma State College became Sonoma State University when the school officially gained university status, after which the surrounding community provided funds for the new university to build a large swimming pool, completed in 1982, and the 500-seat Evert Person Theatre in 1989. Further enrollment increases and a new goal of movement toward a residential campus as opposed to a commuter campus facilitated the building of Verdot Village in 1995.

21st-century expansion

In May 2001, the Board of Trustees approved a new master plan, which added  to the campus, located north of Copeland Creek. Rapidly accelerated growth of the residential student body was alleviated by the construction of the third phase of on-campus housing named Sauvignon Village, offering housing to non-freshman students. In the same year, the Jean and Charles Schulz Information Center was completed to accommodate the expanded needs of the library and computing services. The facility was built as a prototype library and information complex for the 21st century, housing more than 400,000 volumes in its stacks. The center also houses an advanced Automated Retrieval System (ARS) which contains an additional 750,000 volumes in a computer-managed shelving system in the library wing.  A large portion of the funding to build the information center was donated by Charles Schulz, cartoonist and author of the popular Peanuts comic series, and his wife Jean.

In January 2005, the university began the renovation of Darwin Hall, the university's science building, which had been built in 1967. The new building was designed to provide efficient academic classrooms and study areas for faculty and their students. The renovated structure was completed and re-opened in fall 2006 and provided new laboratories and classrooms to support the needs of a modern science curriculum.

The new property approved by the board of trustees in 2000 is also the site of the Donald and Maureen Green Music Center, funded by private donors. A component of the Green Music Center, Music Education Hall, was state-funded. The center contains the 1,400-seat Joan and Sanford I. Weill Hall, which was completed in 2012. Its resident orchestra is the Santa Rosa Symphony.

In May 2007, SSU faculty voted no confidence in President Armiñana based upon financial issues surrounding the building of the Green Music Center, and faculty allegations that the building of the center took money away from academic programs. The center, originally intended to be a US$10 million project, grew into a $120 million complex as additional venues and features were added to the original plan. The construction of the center was initially funded by bond measures, loans, and private donations as the use of academic funds for other uses is illegal. The Board of Trustees continued to support Armiñana despite the vote.

In February 2010, the FBI and investigators from the Sonoma County District Attorney's offices raided the campus's administrative and finance offices seizing dozens of boxes from a storage area, and examined computers. The operation focused on an alleged misuse of federal grant money by the California Institute for Human Services (CIHS), a unit closed by SSU in 2007. The two top CIHS administrators were dismissed at that time.

A new social center for the university gained approval in April 2011. Students voted to raise their fees by $150 a semester to cover the cost of the $65 million facility.

Presidents
The Office of the President began with the university's founding in 1960 when Ambrose R. Nichols, Jr. became the founding president of the university.  there have been eight presidents of Sonoma State University. In January 2016, the California State University Board of Trustees appointed Judy Sakaki as Sonoma State's next president. Sakaki's term was from July 1, 2016 to July 31, 2022.

Campus 

Directly adjacent to the main campus is Wolf's Den Plaza, a frequent hangout and eating area for SSU students. As of fall 2018 Sonoma State had the third-largest white enrollment percentage of Americans in the California State University system.

University library
The three-story,  library is separated into two wings housing different areas on each floor. The library houses a collection of writings and original letters from Jack London, as well as memorabilia relating to his works. The $41.5 million building is named after Charles M. Schulz, the creator of the Peanuts comic cartoon, and his wife Jean, who donated $5 million to help build and furnish the structure.

Campus bookstore 
The Sonoma State Bookstore was operated by Sonoma State Enterprises, Inc. until the spring of 2006 when the operation was outsourced to Barnes & Noble College Booksellers, despite some opposition from faculty members.

Off-campus sites 
In addition to the main campus, the university also owns and operates two off–campus study sites for students of the natural sciences. The first site is the  Fairfield Osborn Preserve, located on nearby Sonoma Mountain. The second site is the  Galbreath Wildlands Preserve in Mendocino County. Both offer opportunities for research and hands-on education to students of the university. Sonoma State also offers students the opportunity to obtain their bachelor's degree in liberal arts partly through classes offered at Napa Valley College and the Vallejo Satellite Campus of Solano Community College.

Green Music Center 
Music Education Hall (one of 4 components of the Green Music Center) opened its doors in 2008 to students taking classes in the two 60-person classrooms. The focal point of the Green Music Center is a 1,400-seat concert hall featuring precision engineered acoustics, named the Joan and Sanford I. Weill Hall. The entire rear wall of the hall opens to lawn seating for a total of 4,000 additional guests. The Hospitality Center, which includes a restaurant/executive conference center, opened in 2010. A $12 million donation from Joan and Sandy Weill, announced in March 2011, provided the funds to complete the concert hall for the fall 2012 opening. The 250-seat Schroeder Recital Hall opened in 2014.

Academics 
Sonoma State offers 46 majors and 49 minors at the undergraduate level as of 2017. The school features a joint master's degree program in mathematics with San Francisco State University and a  wine-business program. Popular majors for undergraduates in 2018 included Business Administration (Management and Operations) at 18.43%, Psychology (General) at 9.02%, and Sociology at 7.05%. Popular majors for graduates were Business Administration (Management and Operations) at 24.70%, Education (General) at 16.33% and Student Counseling and Personnel Services at 11.95%. SONOMA State has the highest transfer graduation rate in the CSU System.

Rankings 

niche.com ranked SONOMA State 1 & 3	Best Housing in the CSU, and State.

The 2023 USNWR Best Regional Colleges West Rankings ranks Sonoma 15 on Top Public School, 36 on Top Performers on Social Mobility and 247 in Nursing (tie).
 
The 2022 USNWR Best Regional Colleges West Rankings ranks Sonoma 16 on Top Public School, 47 on Top Performers on Social Mobility and 251 in Nursing (tie).

The 2021 USNWR Best Regional Colleges West Rankings ranks Sonoma 14 on Top Public Schools and 48 on Top Performers on Social Mobility. While Forbes ranked in 2019 the university 160th among public colleges, 90 among universities in the West, and 179 among "America's best value colleges".

Schools and special programs 
There are more than 65 departments and academic programs divided into six schools. Each school offers major and minor courses for undergraduate, graduate, and doctorate degrees

 School of Arts & Humanities
 Hutchins School of Liberal Studies
 School of Business and Economics
 Wine Business Program
 School of Education
 School of Extended & International Education
 School of Social Sciences
 Fairfield Osborn Preserve
Galbreath Wildlands Preserve
Sonoma State Observatory

Hutchins School of Liberal Studies
The Hutchins School of Liberal Studies is a nationally–known interdisciplinary learning community within the larger institution of Sonoma State University. HIPPS was under the direction of professor Francisco Vázquez for many years. Mario Savio's final teaching post was in Hutchins. Stephanie Dyer was appointed director.

Wine business program
Sonoma State's location in the California Wine Country allows the school to offer courses in viticulture including the Wine Business program. Courses are offered in wine marketing, wine finance and accounting, human resources management, wine business strategies, wine production, operations, and distribution.

Admissions 

SSU has a  65:35 ratio of female to male students.

Associations and accreditations 
Sonoma State is accredited by the Western Association of Schools and Colleges. Several of the schools within Sonoma State also have additional accreditations, such as the School of Business and Economics, which is accredited by the Association to Advance Collegiate Schools of Business. The Mental Health Counseling masters degree program is accredited by the Masters in Psychology and Counseling Accreditation Council (MPCAC).Sonoma State University is the only California school that belongs to the Council of Public Liberal Arts Colleges.

Art from the Heart 
Art from the Heart, an annual art auction, has been held at the university since 1984 to raise funds for the art gallery's display, advertising, and lecture program by selling invited artists' work.

Student life

Athletics 

Sonoma State teams compete in intercollegiate athletics as the Sonoma State Seawolves. Sonoma State University is an NCAA Division II member and part of the California Collegiate Athletic Association (CCAA), Western Water Polo Association (WWPA) and the Pacific West Conference (PacWest). Ten of SSU's sports are in the CCAA, water polo is in the WWPA, and men's and women's tennis are in the PacWest.

Sonoma State athletics began in 1964 with the school's first men's basketball team. Through the years, the Seawolves have had various successes including national championships in 1990 (women's soccer), 2002 (men's soccer), and 2009 (men's golf). The school's traditional colors are navy, Columbia, and white. SSU athletic teams participate in the CCAA, an association within the NCAA's Division II. The SSU Athletic Department offers nine NCCAA women's sports teams and five men's teams. Women's track and field has recently been re-added to university's program. Besides both being located in the west of California, but one in the south and the other in the north, Sonoma and Dominguez Hills have competed heavily as conference rivals in soccer.

In the spring of 2020, it was announced that men's tennis, women's tennis, and women's water polo would be disbanded due to insufficient funding.

Men's (2)
Golf: 2009
Soccer: 2002
Women's (1)
Soccer: 1990

Housing 
Sonoma State provides suite, apartment, and townhouse style housing. There are six villages on campus, named after wines: Cabernet, Zinfandel, Verdot, Sauvignon, Beaujolais, and Tuscany. There are two swimming pools/spas. Sonoma State's dorms are ranked #25 in the nation as of 2015, according to Niche Rankings.

Student organizations
Sonoma State University has over one hundred chartered student organizations, including fraternities and sororities, and over twenty sports clubs. Several teams, run by students, compete regionally and in national tournaments.

Student government
Associated Students (AS) is a student organization. The AS Senate is the student government and board of directors of the corporation. AS also encompasses two smaller divisions, Associated Students Productions (ASP), which plans and produces on-campus concerts and student events, and Join Us Making Progress (JUMP), which organizes community service programs.

Notable faculty and alumni

Demographics

The United States Census Bureau has designated the Sonoma State University campus as a separate census-designated place (CDP) for statistical purposes. It first appeared as a CDP in the 2020 Census with a population of 2,679.

2020 census

Note: the US Census treats Hispanic/Latino as an ethnic category. This table excludes Latinos from the racial categories and assigns them to a separate category. Hispanics/Latinos can be of any race.

See also

Notes

References

External links

 
1960 establishments in California
Sonoma
Sonoma
Educational institutions established in 1960
Public liberal arts colleges in the United States
Rohnert Park, California
Schools accredited by the Western Association of Schools and Colleges
Universities and colleges in Sonoma County, California
Liberal arts colleges in California